Guy Hermier (1940–2001) was a French politician. He served as a member of the National Assembly from 1978 to 2001, representing Bouches-du-Rhône's 4th constituency. He managed to get along with members of the Socialist Party in Marseille, at a time when Communists and Socialists did not always see eye to eye. He was buried in the Saint-Pierre Cemetery in Marseille.

References

1940 births
2001 deaths
Politicians from Marseille
French Communist Party politicians
Deaths from cancer in France
Deputies of the 11th National Assembly of the French Fifth Republic